Atlantic Grill is a seafood restaurant located at 50 West 65th street of Manhattan, New York City.

The 220-seat restaurant opened in 1998. It specializes in fish dishes, and is noted for its by-the-glass wine list.

The restaurant's wood and chrome bar is lined with photographs of the French Riviera by Jacques-Henri Lartigue. The main dining room has brown velour Hollywood booths and ecru chairs.

The restaurant was originally owned by B.R. Guest.  In late 2021,  Monte Carlo Hospitality Group,  became the new management of the restaurant.

In 2013, Zagat gave it a rating of 23 for food.

See also
 List of restaurants in New York City
 List of seafood restaurants

References

External links

New York Magazine review and listing
New York Times review and listing
Zagat review and listing

Restaurants established in 1998
Upper East Side
Restaurants in Manhattan
1998 establishments in New York City
Seafood restaurants in New York (state)
Third Avenue